Rehman may refer to a Muslim surname meaning "Merciful", "King", or "Lord". It is an honorary title used by some Muslims of Sheikh or Sayyid Caste of Middle Eastern Origin, as well as a common surname or middle-name among some Pashtun tribemen, or some royal descendants of the Afghan-Royal lineage family. There is also a German surname named Rehmann.

People
 Rehman, alternative spelling of Rahman (name)
Rehman (actor) (1921–1984), an Indian film actor 
Rehman (Pakistani actor) (1937–2005), a Pakistani-Bangladeshi film actor

Surname
Saleema Rehman (born 1990/91), Afghan refugee doctor
 Waheeda Rehman (born 1938), Indian actress

Given name
 Rehman Chishti (born 1978), British politician 
 Rehman Dakait, Pakistani gangster
 Rehman Rahi (1925–2023), Kashmiri poet, translator and critic
 Rehman Sobhan, Bangladeshi economist and freedom fighter

Places
 Rehman Dheri, an archaeological site in Pakistan

See also
 
 
 Rahman (disambiguation)